Bună Ziua (Romanian for Good Day) is a housing district in Cluj-Napoca in Romania. It was erected after the Romanian Revolution of 1989, and is located on the southern side of the city.

Districts of Cluj-Napoca